Final Selection is a synthpop band from Germany founded in 1993 by Mario Tews (keyboards) and Riccardo Schult (vocals) featuring English lyrics. The band produces melancholic synthpop.

History

The band's first demo tapes were released in 1993–1996.

Final Selection performed at the Wave Gotik Treffen festival in 1999, and at the 
EuroRock Festival in 2002 in Belgium.

The band has been remixed by Aslan Faction and NamNamBulu 
. Final Selection has remixed the band Wave in Head (which was released on the US records label A Different Drum) and the band Epsilon Minus.

Final Selection appeared on a number of compilations, amongst these
the "Our Voices - A Tribute To The Cure" compilation that was released on the Irond label
.

The band received favorable reviews by Side-line magazine,.

Discography

Albums and EPs
 AntiHero (LP, 2003, Black Flames Records)
 Heading for Graceland (EP, 2004, Black Flames Records)
 Meridian (LP, 2005, Black Flames Records)
 Clockworks (LP 2008, FlashpopMedia)

References

External links
Official website
Official MySpace site
ZeitGeist Magazine Interview - 2005
Final Selection at Last.fm
Final Selection at Discogs
Review of Meridian at Side-line magazine
Review of AntiHero at The Electrogarden Network

German synthpop groups